Murat Soygeniş FAIA, (born 1961), a Founding Partner of S+ ARCHITECTURE, is an internationally recognized architect and professor. He is known with his contributions to architecture, planning, design, theoretical writing and teaching.

Biography
Murat Soygenis FAIA, a founding partner at S+ ARCHITECTURE is a professor/architect practicing in Istanbul. He received his architectural education in Istanbul, Turkey (B.Arch., ITU) and in Buffalo New York, USA (M.Arch., University at Buffalo). He has served as the Dean of School of Architecture (YTU) and received awards for his contributions to profession. Soygenis has given numerous lectures in various countries, received architectural firm awards including from the RIBA Journal among many, participated in exhibitions and served as a jury member in many international architectural prizes and competitions. He is a Fellow of the American Institute of Architects, a member of the Chamber of Architects in Istanbul (UIA) and the Royal Institute of British Architects (RIBA).

Work
S+ ARCHITECTURE is an architecture and urban design firm. S+ provides a platform for design research for wide array of projects ranging from urban to object scale and spanning a great geographic reach. S+ ARCHITECTURE follows a design process dedicated to integration of building and urban context, and finding innovative solutions for specific problems. The firm explores new ways to respond to the specific programmatic requirements of each unique project. At early stages of design, the focus is on site, program, context and green innovation which leads to creation of place-sensitive and concept-driven design with sustainable buildings and environments that are innovative and imaginative.

S+ completed projects at multiple scales, from storage units, to minimal dwellings, large palaces, university buildings and production plants. Some of the projects involve new buildings and renovation of historically important structures as well. S+ ARCHITECTURE’s portfolio of projects were developed with the innovative and technical expertise of the firm and by collaborating with teams of creative architects, engineers and designers.

S+ projects were widely published and exhibited, and received architectural design awards. The projects were exhibited at AIA Baltimore, University at Buffalo, Milan Fair, Polytechnic University of Turin, The Union of Architects of Russia in Moscow and many cities in various countries. The firm is affiliated with Chamber of Architects (UIA), American Institute of Architects College of Fellows (FAIA) and Royal Institute of British Architects (RIBA).

Exhibitions

Various personal and group exhibition of architectural work in USA, Europe and Turkey.

Projects were on display in Baltimore, Buffalo, Philadelphia, New York and throughout Turkey, 1981-today
Baltimore American Institute of Architects, Architects' Gallery, 1990, 2002, 2015
University at Buffalo, School of Architecture and Planning, 2002
Polytechnic University of Turin, School of Architecture, 2007
Milan Build Up Expo, 2007
20th Century Turkish Architecture, House of Architects Moscow, 2008

Publications

Authored books
Yapi 2 (Building Construction 2), Birsen Yayin, Istanbul, 2000.
Yapi 3 (Building Construction 3), Birsen Yayin, Istanbul, 2002.
Yapi 4 (Building Construction 4), Birsen Yayin, Istanbul, 2003.
Yapi 1-2-3-4 (with Sedad H. Eldem), Birsen Yayin, Istanbul, 2005.
Istanbul Bir Kent Yorumu / An Urban Commentary (with Sema Soygenis), Birsen Yayin, Istanbul, 2006. 
Turkiye'de Mimarlik (Architecture in Turkey), Canakkale Seramik Kalebodur, Istanbul, 2007.
Platform for Architecture (with Peter Cook), Aracne, Rome (Italy), May 2011.
Utopias for Istanbul (with Peter Cook), Aracne, Rome (Italy), May 2011. 
Mimarlik: Yasamin icinden (Architecture: Through life), Birsen Yayin, Istanbul, 2012.

Monographs and related books
Altinok, S. (Ed.), Sema-Murat Soygenis / Buildings and Projects 1982-1997, Birsen Yayin, Istanbul, 1997.
Adali, S. (Ed.), Yildiz Bulusmasi: Mimarlik Uygulamalari Tartismasi (Yildiz Meetings: Discussions on Architectural Work), Tasarim Yayin Grubu, Istanbul, 1999.
Soygenis, M., Tumertekin, H., and others, Ucuncu Mesaj / Third Message, Birsen Yayin, Istanbul, 2000.
Adali, S. (Ed.), Yildiz Bulusmasi 2001 (Yildiz Meetings 2001), Birsen Yayinevi, Istanbul, 2001.
Yuksel, E. (Ed.), Sema-Murat Soygenis / Buildings + Projects 2 (Giris / Introduction U. Alsac), Birsen Yayin, Istanbul, 2003.
Adali, S. (Ed.), Yildiz Bulusmasi 04 (Yildiz Meetings 04), Betonart, Istanbul, 2004.
Adali, S. (Ed.), bulusmalar 06 meetings / Suha Ozkan - Introduction, Canakkale Seramik Kalebodur, Istanbul, 2007.
Barbano, G. (Ed.), Architetti 'americani' in Europa - AIA Continental Europe, Aracne, Rome, 2007.
Soygenis, M., Ozkan, S., et al., Sedat Gurel Projeleri ve Yasami / Projects and Life, Sedat Guzin Gurel Sanat ve Bilim Vakfi, Istanbul, 2008.
Celik, B. (Ed.), Cifteler kayitlari (Cifteler records), MAT Yapim, Istanbul, 2009.
Barbano, G. (Ed.), Visioning Architecture: The Sketches of Murat Soygenis (Forewords by Gabriela Goldschmidt, Steve Badanes, Cover text by Andrea Oppenheimer Dean), Aracne Editrice, Rome, 2017.

References 

2017    —–, “Murat Soygenis – Soylesi (Interview)”, Tasarim, Sayi 277, s. 70-73, Aralik 2017. architectureplatform. Accessed 17 Jan 2019.

2015    —–, “S+ ARCHITECTURE’s Recent Projects on Display at AIA Baltimore” 03 Oct 2015. ArchDaily. Accessed 2 Nov 2015.

2015    —–, “S+ ARCHITECTURE’s Recent Projects on Display at AIA Baltimore” 17 Aug 2015. AIA Maryland. Accessed 2 Nov 2015.

2015    —–, “Murat Soygenis (Interview)”, Konsept Projeler, Sayi 46, s. 70-75, 2015.

2012    —–, “Bir Mimar ve Cephe: Murat Soygenis (Interview – An Architect: Murat Soygenis), Cati ve Cephe, Yil 7 Sayi 41, s. 30-32, Kasim-Aralik 2012.

2010 Seckin, F., Milosyan, G., “Yaratici Mimar: Murat Soygenis (Creative Architect)”, Insaat Dunyasi, Sayi 330, s. 94-105, Ekim 2010.

2010    —–, “Murat Soygenis – Interview”, Tasarim, Sayi 204, s. 94-96, Eylul 2010.

2010    —–, “Farkli Kotlarda Oyunlar (Play on different levels)”, XXI Mimarlik Tasarim Mekan, Sayi 87, s. 48-49, Mart 2010.

2010    —–, “Emirgan’da Bir Lise (A High School at Emirgan)”, Yapi, Sayi 339, s. 92-94, Subat 2010.

2009    —–, “Bir Egitim Yapisini Yeniden Islevlendirmek: Cifteler Koy Enstitusu (Reusing an Educational Building: Cifteler Village Institute)”, Arredamento Mimarlik, Sayi 2009/10, s.41-42, Ekim 2009.

2009    —–, “Ilk Yapi: Arnavutkoy’de Bir Konut (First Building)”, Mimarizm / Mimarlik ve Tasarim Yayin Platformu, Website Retrieval Date: 05 Haziran 2009.

2009 Alsac, U., “Isil-Ay Syndrome or Must Architecture Be Without Gender”, Ustun Alsac Website, Website Retrieval Date: 5 June 2009.

2009 Alsac, U., “Women Architects”, Ustun Alsac Website, Website Retrieval Date: 05 Haziran 2009.

2008 Maden, F., Between Deconstructivist Architecture and Hyper-Historicism: Daniel Libeskind and Turkish Architects (Unpublished Master's Thesis), İzmir Institute of Technology, Graduate School of Engineering and Sciences, İzmir, June 2008.

2006 Ozuak, U., “Mimari: En iyi bildigin isi yap!”, Hincal’in Yeri (Hincal Uluc) / Sabah, 12 Aralik 2006.

2005    —–, An Exhibition by Turkish Architects at Building Information Center in Istanbul, Arab Construction World (Lebanon),  Vol XXII Issue 3, s.59, Beyrut, Lubnan, April 2005.

2004    —–, ‘An Educational Facility in a Recently Planned Campus in Turkey’, Arab Construction World, Vol.XXI Issue 2, s.68, Beyrut, Lubnan, March–April 2004.

2003 Alsac, U., “Mimarlik konusunda iki ilginc kitap”, Cumhuriyet Kitap (Yayin Tanitim : Yapilar + Projeler 2, Birsen yayinevi, Istanbul, 2003), Sayi 691, s. 14, 15 Mayis 2003.

2002    —–, “First Thursday”, AIABaltimore, July–August 2002, s. 5.

2002    —–, “Yeni dunya, yerli projeler”, Radikal, 29 Ags 2002, s. 17.

2001 	Kanbur, H. “Kitap” (Book), Mimarlara Mektup (Book review : Ucuncu Mesaj, Birsen Yayinevi, Istanbul, 2000), July 2001, p. 15.

2001 	Alsac, U. “Mimarlik kitaplari” (Architectural books), Cumhuriyet Kitap (Turkey) (Book review : M. Soygenis, Yapi 2, Birsen Yayinevi, Istanbul 2000), No. 587, 17 May 2001, p. 14-15.

2001 	—–, The International Urban Competition / Sarajevo, The Institute for Planning and Reconstruction of the Sarajevo Canton, Sarajevo, March 2001.

2001 	Acımert T., Cenker, E. (Eds.) “Ogrenci Projeleri” (Student Projects), mimar.ist (Turkey), No. 1, Winter 2001, p. 110-115.

2000 	Kuloglu, N. “Bir Temel Egitim Dersi Uygulamasi ve Deneyimler” (A basic educational course and experiences), Mimarlik (Turkey), No. 00/06, 2000, 
p. 44-48.

2000 	—–, “Ucuncu Mesaj : Ucuncu Dunya’dan Mimarlik ve Kultur Perspektifleri / M. Soygenis (Book review), Radikal Cumartesi (Turkey), No. 208, 21 October 2000, p.13.
	
2000 	Komurcuoglu, G. “YTU Davutpasa Kampusunde Fakulte Tasarimi” (A school design at YTU Davutpasa Campus), Tasarim (Turkey), No. 103, July–August 2000, p. 133-139.

2000  	—–, “Yapi 2 / Murat Soygenis (Book review)”, Arredamento Mimarlik (Turkey), No. 2000/02, February 2000, p. 134.

1998 	—–, “Chemical Factory in Istanbul”, Architecture Europe, (Project Profile / Ed. F. Vonier), Paris, Summer 1998, p. 14.

1997 	—–, Baskanlik Hizmet Binasi Proje Yarismasi (Project Competition for Municipality Headquarters), Cankaya Belediyesi, no publication place and date.

1997  	—–, “Bursa Uluslararasi Fuar Alanı Kongre-Kultur Merkezi ve Konaklama-Agirlama Tesisleri Mimari Proje Yarismasi" (Bursa International Fairgrounds / Congress Center Architectural Competition), Mimarlik (Turkey), No. 278, 1997, p. 20.

1997  	—–, “Konya Cifte Kumbetler Parki ve Cevresi Kentsel Tasarim Proje Yarismasi” (Konya Cifte Kumbetler Park Urban Design Competition), Mimar – TSMD (Turkey), 
No. 10-11, 1997, p. 5.

1997 	—–, “Yapilar ve Projeler 1982-1997 / Sema ve Murat Soygenis (Book review), Arredamento Dekorasyon (Turkey), No. 96, October 1997, p.138.

1997 	Alsac, U. “Mimarlik kitaplari arasinda bir gezinti” (Stroll amongst architectural books), Cumhuriyet Kitap (Turkey) (Book review : S.M. Soygenis, Yapilar ve Projeler 1982-1997, Birsen Yayinevi, Istanbul 1997), No. 401, 23 October 1997, p. 8.

1996 Yucel, A. “Istanbul’da 19. Yuzyilin Kentsel Konut Bicimleri” (Urban housing typology in 19th century Istanbul), Tarihten Gunumuze Anadolu’da Konut ve Yerlesme / Housing and Settlement in Anatolia : A Historical Perspective, Tarih Vakfi Yayinlari, Istanbul, 1996, 
p. 298-312.
				
1996  	Kacel, E. (Ed.) “Anadoluhisari’nda Deniz Sporlari Kulubu ve Rekreatif Alan Duzenlemesi” (Water sports club and recreation area design at Anadoluhisari), Tasarim (Turkey), No. 58, 1996, p. 117-119.

1992 	Karduz, A.R. “Asitane Restaurant / Lifestyle”, Star (Turkey), No. 28, 26 April 1992, p. 24-25.

1992 	—–, “Sapanca Bildirisi” (Sapanca Declaration), Ege Mimarlik (Turkey), No. 4, January 1992, p. 9.

1992 	—–, “3. Ulusal Mimarlik Sergisi ve Odulleri 1992” (3 rd National Architectural Exhibition and Awards 1992), Mimarlik (Turkey), No. 248, 1992, p. 28-31.

1992	—–, “Asitane Restaurant”, Show (Turkey), No. 38, 13 December 1992, p. 36.

1991    —–, Kariye Oteli / Asitane Restaurant (Brochure), Istanbul, no date.

1991	—–, “Yasam : Buharli Trende Mimarlik Paneli” (Architecture meeting in steam train), Nokta (Turkey), 17 November 1991, p. 52-53.

1991 	—–, “Sapanca Bildirisi” (Sapanca Declaration), Arkitekt (Turkey), No. 10, 1991, p. 55-82.

1991 	—–, “Sapanca Bildirisi” (Sapanca Declaration), Arkitekt (Turkey), No. 19, 1991, p. 4.

1990	—–, “Studio Soygenis”, Broadsheet, Baltimore Chapter / The American Institute of Architects, Baltimore MD, Sep-October 1990.

1988	Shibley, R. Buffalo, New York : Design Research On The Retail Core, SUNYAB, Buffalo NY, 1988.

1986 Stea, D. “Placemaking and Production in Prehistory: A Comparative Study in Dialectical Perspective”, Architecture in Cultural Change / Essays in Built Form & Culture Research (Ed. D.G. Saile), Built Form and Culture Studies, School of Architecture and Urban Design, The University of Kansas, 1986, p. 91-107.

1984	ADPSR. Quonset Huts on The River Styx – The Bomb Shelter Design Book, North Atlantic Books, Berkeley CA, 1987, p. 46.

1984	Soong, T.T., Bilgutay, A., Schmitz, G. “Aesthetics of Tall Structures with Aerodynamic Appendages” (Paper prepared for the International Conference on Tall Buildings, Singapore), Innovative Building Technology Information 11, Department of Architecture, SUNYAB, 
5 pages, Buffalo NY, May 1984.

1984  	Schmitz, G., Bilgutay, A. “Building with Fabrics and Cables : A Bibliography”, Innovative Building Technology Information 6, Department of Architecture, SUNYAB, 
38 pages, Buffalo NY, April 1984.

1984	—–, “TAC Odulleri Verildi” (TAC Awards given, Cumhuriyet (Turkey), 24 May 1983.

For complete reference list see: http://www.muratsoygenis.net

Notes

External links
 S+ ARCHITECTURE official website

Living people
1961 births
Architects from Istanbul
Kabataş Erkek Lisesi alumni
University at Buffalo alumni